This is a list of chapters based on the manga series Whistle! by Daisuke Higuchi. It is the story of an up-and-coming soccer player. The manga was serialized in Weekly Shonen Jump in 1998 and was later licensed by Viz Media in North America.



Volumes list

Whistle!

Whistle! W

References

External links

Whistle! at Viz Media

Whistle!